Princess Adelaide of Schaumburg-Lippe (22 September 187527 January 1971) was daughter of Prince William of Schaumburg-Lippe and consort of the last reigning Duke of Saxe-Altenburg Ernst II.

Early life
Adelaide was born at Ratiboritz, Kingdom of Bohemia (now Ratibořice, seventh child and third daughter of Prince William of Schaumburg-Lippe (1834–1906), (son of George William, Prince of Schaumburg-Lippe and Princess Ida of Waldeck and Pyrmont) and his wife, Princess Bathildis of Anhalt-Dessau (1837–1902), (daughter of Prince Frederick Augustus of Anhalt-Dessau and Princess Marie Luise Charlotte of Hesse-Kassel). In 1891, her sister Charlotte became Queen Consort of William II of Württemberg.

Marriage
Adelaide married 17 February 1898 at Bückeburg to Prince Ernst of Saxe-Altenburg (1871–1955), son of Prince Moritz of Saxe-Altenburg, and his wife, Princess Augusta of Saxe-Meiningen. The marriage ended in divorce on 17 January 1920.

They had four children:
Princess Charlotte of Saxe-Altenburg (4 March 1899 – 16 February 1989), married on 11 July 1919 to Prince Sigismund of Prussia, had issue.
Georg Moritz, Hereditary Prince of Saxe-Altenburg (13 May 1900 – 13 February 1991)
Princess Elisabeth Karola of Saxe-Altenburg (6 April 1903 – 30 January 1991)
Prince Frederick Ernst of Saxe-Altenburg (15 May 1905 – 23 February 1985)

Ancestry

Notes and sources
thePeerage.com - Friederike Adelheid Marie Luise Hilda Eugenie Prinzessin zu Schaumburg-Lippe
L'Allemagne dynastique, Huberty, Giraud, Magdelaine, Reference: II 295
Genealogisches Handbuch des Adels, Fürstliche Häuser, Reference: 1961

|-
 

 

1875 births
1971 deaths
People from Česká Skalice
People from the Kingdom of Bohemia
House of Lippe
Princesses of Schaumburg-Lippe
House of Saxe-Altenburg
Princesses of Saxe-Altenburg